Humphrey Nabimanya is a globally celebrated Ugandan social entrepreneur, philanthropist, peer educator, founder and team leader at Reach A Hand, Uganda.

Early life 
Nabimanya was born on 14 November 1988 in Katereza Rugando Rwamapara, Mbarara to Mr. Rwanyamukanga Yafesi and Ms. Endinais Barbara Kyetarire. The couple share 8 children including Dan Bwegare, Jessica Census, Kyembabazi Dorah, Rogers Musasizi, Sasira Hope and Enock Mbareba.

Education 
Nabimanya attended Rubaga Primary school (Queen of Peace) in 2003, Kiira College Butiki from 2004-2007 for his 0’level, and Namirembe Hillside High School between 2008 – 2009. In 2013, he graduated from Makerere University with a bachelor's degree in community psychology.

Career 
A recipient of the 2011 Young Achievers Award for Film and Photography, Humphrey is a seasoned youth Sexual Reproductive Health and Rights (SRHR) advocate, leader, change agent and a presenter of a youth empowerment show on NBS Television in Uganda.

In 2011 while in his first year at the University, Nabimanya founded Reach A Hand, Uganda a youth led non-profit organization focused on youth empowerment programs with an emphasis on Sexual Reproductive Health and Rights (SRHR), HIV/AIDS awareness and prevention. "A youth Advocate in Africa with more than years of hands on experience in Sexual and Reproductive Health and Rights" (SRHR), youth empowerment and related issues.

Through Reach A Hand Uganda, Nabimanya has created a movement of young advocates through a youth led and youth serving platform of over 46 core team members and 1,755 volunteers (growing per year) under the Peer Educators Academy who by the end of 2020 had helped to directly reach over 6,618,171 through various project interventions and 18,205,652 through social media. Reach A Hand Uganda currently has interventions in 66 schools reaching approximately 20,100 young people and 67,193 out of school young people.

Humphrey educates youth about sexual reproductive health and rights. He supports his peers take control of their lives and present themselves in ways that inspires, impresses and spurs confidence in themselves and their peers under a platform where they have full opportunities to take part in the process of breaking barriers hindering  them from making informed choices in life regarding their SRHR.

Currently, Humphrey is the executive producer of Kyaddala, It’s Real, a pan African series that shines a light on real life social issues that affect young people across Africa and their attempts to overcome those issues. Kyaddala, It’s Real has two seasons now airing on Pearl Magic Prime and Pearl Magic TV.

Recognition and awards 
 2018 Most Influential Young Africans by the Africa Youth Awards
 Recipient for the Leadership Award at the ASFAS 2016
 Humanitarian Broadcasting personality by RTV Academy 2014
 Segal Family Foundation Annual Rising Star recipient 2014
 Recipient, Youth Advocate by Public Health Awards 2014
 Nominee MTV Base Africa Leadership Award in the MTV Africa Music Awards 2014
 Awarded by the president and the First Lady of Uganda towards his support to the youth through his Reach A Hand foundation
 Nambi Children's Initiative in 2012
 Awarded as a strong advocate and emerged up as a Young Achiever 2011
 Recipient of the 2011 Young Achievers Award for Film and Photography
 Teeniez TV Personality Buzz Teens Awards 2011
 Youth Mentor of the Year Award KIBO Foundation in 2010
 Received accolade from DSW for having won the SRH/R quiz that was conducted on 14 December 2009.

References 

1988 births
Living people
Makerere University alumni
Ugandan television personalities
Sex educators
People educated at Kiira College Butiki